Richard Schreier from Analog Devices Incorporated, Toronto, ON was named Fellow of the Institute of Electrical and Electronics Engineers (IEEE) in 2015 for contributions to delta-sigma data converters.

References 
 
2.University of Toronto, Department of Electrical and Computer Engineering - Richard E. Schreier Biography

Fellow Members of the IEEE
Living people
Year of birth missing (living people)
Place of birth missing (living people)